John Joseph Feely (August 1, 1875 – February 15, 1905) was a U.S. Representative from Illinois.

Born on a farm near Wilmington, Illinois, Feely attended the public schools. He was graduated from Niagara University in 1895 and from the law department of Yale University in 1897. He was admitted to the bar in Connecticut in 1897. He moved to Chicago, Illinois in 1898 and engaged in the practice of law.

Feely was elected as a Democrat to the Fifty-seventh Congress (March 4, 1901 – March 3, 1903). He was not a candidate for renomination in 1902. He engaged in the practice of his profession until his death in Chicago at age 29, from gastritis, and was interred in Mount Olivet Cemetery in Joliet, Illinois. He was a Catholic and unmarried at the time of his passing.

Fermanagh and Omagh District Council's  John Feely, councillor from Fermanagh, Northern Ireland, is a distant relative.

References

1875 births
1905 deaths
Politicians from Chicago
Niagara University alumni
Yale Law School alumni
Democratic Party members of the United States House of Representatives from Illinois
19th-century American politicians
People from Wilmington, Will County, Illinois
Connecticut lawyers
Illinois lawyers